is an earthfill dam located near the city of Imabari in Ehime Prefecture in Japan and used for irrigation. The catchment area of the dam is 3.8 square kilometres. The dam impounds about 11 hectares of land when full and can store 609 thousand cubic meters of water. The construction of the dam was started in 1935 and completed by 1938.

References

Dams in Ehime Prefecture
1938 establishments in Japan